In mathematics, the Weil–Brezin map, named after André Weil and Jonathan Brezin, is a unitary transformation that maps a Schwartz function on the real line  to a smooth function  on the Heisenberg manifold. The Weil–Brezin map gives a geometric interpretation of the Fourier transform, the Plancherel theorem and the Poisson summation formula. The image of Gaussian functions under the Weil–Brezin map are nil-theta functions, which are related to theta functions. The Weil–Brezin map is sometimes referred to as the Zak transform, which is widely applied in the field of physics and signal processing; however, the Weil–Brezin Map is defined via Heisenberg group geometrically, whereas there is no direct geometric or group theoretic interpretation from the Zak transform.

Heisenberg manifold
The (continuous) Heisenberg group  is the 3-dimensional Lie group that can be represented by triples of real numbers with multiplication rule
 
The discrete Heisenberg group  is the discrete subgroup of  whose elements are represented by the triples of integers.
The Heisenberg group acts on the Heisenberg manifold on the right. The Haar measure  on the Heisenberg group induces a right-translation-invariant measure on the Heisenberg manifold. The space of complex-valued square-integrable functions on the Heisenberg manifold has a right-translation-invariant orthogonal decomposition:

where 
.

Definition
The Weil–Brezin map  is the unitary transformation given by 
 
for every Schwartz function , where convergence is pointwise.

The inverse of the Weil–Brezin map  is given by

Fundamental unitary representation of the Heisenberg group
. 
By Stone–von Neumann theorem, this is the unique irreducible representation up to unitary equivalence satisfying the canonical commutation relation
.
.

Relation to Fourier transform
Let  be the automorphism on the Heisenberg group given by
.
It naturally induces a unitary operator , then the Fourier transform 

Plancherel theorem

Poisson summation formula
For any Schwartz function ,
.
This is just the Poisson summation formula.

Relation to the finite Fourier transform 
For each , the subspace  can further be decomposed into right-translation-invariant orthogonal subspaces

where 
.

 
is a unitary transformation.

 
for every Schwartz function , where convergence is pointwise.

The inverse map  is given by 

Similarly, the fundamental unitary representation  of the Heisenberg group is unitarily equivalent to the right translation on  through :
.
For any , 
.

For each , let .  Consider the finite dimensional subspace  of  generated by  where
 

Nil-theta functions
Nil-theta functions are functions on the Heisenberg manifold that are analogous to the theta functions on the complex plane. The image of Gaussian functions under the Weil–Brezin Map are nil-theta functions. There is a model of the finite Fourier transform defined with nil-theta functions, and the nice property of the model is that the finite Fourier transform is compatible with the algebra structure of the space of nil-theta functions.

Definition of nil-theta functions
Let  be the complexified Lie algebra of the Heisenberg group .

These vector fields are well-defined on the Heisenberg manifold .

Introduce the notation .

We call

the space of nil-theta functions of degree .

Algebra structure of nil-theta functions
The nil-theta functions with pointwise multiplication on  form a graded algebra  (here ).

Auslander and Tolimieri showed that this graded algebra is isomorphic to 
,
and that the finite Fourier transform (see the preceding section #Relation to the finite Fourier transform) is an automorphism of the graded algebra.

Relation to Jacobi theta functions
Let  be the Jacobi theta function. Then
.

Higher order theta functions with characteristics
,
.
. 
.
These higher order theta functions are related to the nil-theta functions by
.

See also
Nilmanifold
Nilpotent group
Nilpotent Lie algebra
Weil representation
Theta representation
Oscillator representation

References

Harmonic analysis
Representation theory